Math and Science College Preparatory (often shortened to "MSCP") is an independent public charter school located in the West Adams neighborhood of Los Angeles, California.  MSCP  offers students in grades nine through twelve opportunities to take classes that focus on an engineering curriculum in order to prepare students to enter STEM fields at four-year colleges.

References

Charter preparatory schools in California
High schools in Los Angeles
2013 establishments in California